Victor Chapman is a driver in the D1NZ New Zealand national drifting championship. He has competed regularly since 2003, winning his first round at round 4 2004 which was held at Pukekohe Park Raceway.

Results

2007 

DNQ - Did not qualify for the top 16
DNC - Did not compete

New Zealand racing drivers
Living people
Drifting drivers
Year of birth missing (living people)